Ionia is a former municipality on the island of Chios, North Aegean, Greece. Since the 2011 local government reform it is part of the municipality Chios, of which it is a municipal unit. It is located in the southeastern part of the island, and has a land area of 48.272 km². Its population was 3,956 at the 2011 census. The seat of the municipality was in Kallimasia (pop. 958). Other large towns are Nenita (903), Tholopotámi (647) and Katarráktis (408).

Notable people 
Joachim IV, Patriarch of Constantinople

References

Populated places in Chios